The 1996 Paris–Nice was the 54th edition of the Paris–Nice cycle race and was held from 10 March to 17 March 1996. The race started in Châteauroux and finished in Nice. The race was won by Laurent Jalabert of the ONCE team.

General classification

References

1996
1996 in road cycling
1996 in French sport
March 1996 sports events in Europe